Concert: The Cure Live is the first live album by English rock band the Cure. It was recorded in 1984 at the Hammersmith Odeon in London and in Oxford during The Top tour. The cassette tape edition featured, on the B-side, a twin album of anomalies, titled Curiosity (Killing the Cat): Cure Anomalies 1977–1984.

Track listing
Tracks written by Robert Smith, Simon Gallup and Lol Tolhurst, except as noted.

"Shake Dog Shake" (Smith) – 4:14
"Primary" – 3:29
"Charlotte Sometimes" – 4:06
"The Hanging Garden" – 4:05
"Give Me It" (Smith) – 2:49
"The Walk" (Smith, Tolhurst) – 3:31
"One Hundred Years" – 6:48
"A Forest" (Smith, Matthieu Hartley, Gallup, Tolhurst) – 6:46
"10:15 Saturday Night" (Smith, Michael Dempsey, Tolhurst) – 3:44
"Killing an Arab" (Smith, Dempsey, Tolhurst) – 2:51

Cassette tape edition
The B-side of the cassette tape edition of Concert contained a twin album titled Curiosity (Killing the Cat): Cure Anomalies 1977–1984, a set of Cure rarities recorded from 1977 to 1984:
"Heroin Face" (later included on Disc 2 of the remastered Three Imaginary Boys)
"Boys Don't Cry" (later included on Disc 2 of the remastered Three Imaginary Boys)
"Subway Song" (later included on Disc 2 of the remastered Three Imaginary Boys)
"At Night" (later included on Disc 2 of the remastered Seventeen Seconds)
"In Your House" (later included on Disc 2 of the remastered Seventeen Seconds)
"The Drowning Man" (later included on Disc 2 of the remastered Faith)
"Other Voices" (later included on Disc 2 of the remastered Faith)
"The Funeral Party" (later included on Disc 2 of the remastered Faith)
"All Mine" (later included on Disc 2 of the remastered Pornography)
"Forever (Version)" (later included on Disc 2 of the remastered The Top)

Personnel
Robert Smith – vocals, guitar
Porl Thompson – guitar, saxophone, keyboards
Andy Anderson – drums
Phil Thornalley – bass guitar
Lol Tolhurst – keyboards

References 

The Cure live albums
1984 live albums
Albums produced by David M. Allen
Fiction Records live albums
Elektra Records live albums
Albums recorded at the Hammersmith Apollo